Terengganu Football Club is a professional football club based in Kuala Nerus, Terengganu, Malaysia, that competes in Malaysia Super League, the first division of Malaysian football league system. Nicknamed "The Turtles", the club was founded as Terengganu Amateur Football Association on 22 November 1956, changed its name to Terengganu Football Association in 1972 and Terengganu Football Club in 2018.

The club had won major trophies in Malaysian football. Domestically they had won 1 Malaysia Cup, 2 Malaysia FA Cup, 1 Malaysia Charity Shield, 2 Malaysia Premier League titles and 1 FAM League title. Terengganu remains the only state team that has not won the top flight M-League since the introduction of the league in 1982 up until now.

Club licensing regulations

2018 season
 This club had obtained the FAM Club License to play in the 2018 Malaysia Super League season.

2019 season
 This club had obtained the FAM Club License to play in the 2019 Malaysia Super League season.
 This club had obtained the AFC Club License and is eligible to play either 2019 AFC Champions League or 2019 AFC Cup if qualified on merit.

2020 season
 Terengganu Football Club is now a professional football club managed by a corporate company. Ab Rasid Jusoh was appointed as the CEO meanwhile Mohd Sabri Abas was appointed as the COO of Terengganu Football Club Sdn.Bhd

History

This club did not have much success in the 1970s with only a single appearance in the Malaysia Cup final led by Harun Jusoh, losing to Selangor 2–1 in a match played at the Merdeka Stadium.  It was the same in the 1980s with another final appearance in 1982, ironically also against Selangor. It was the same outcome with Selangor winning 1–0 after extra-time.

When the Semi-Professional League was introduced in 1989, Terengganu F.C. were in the second division based on their final position in the previous season.

They recruited giant Dutch defender, Marlon Ricardo van der Sander and Singaporean duo, Ahmad Paijan and Norhalis Shafik to boost their squad and finished the season in a credible fourth place but ultimately failed to win promotion.

In the 1990 season, they went all the way to emerge as the second division champion under the guidance of head coach, Abdullah Mohamed with German striker, Frank Pastor finding the back of the net on regular basis aided by midfield duo Martin Busse and Ahmad Paijan. They lost only once in the league all season to finish three points clear of East Coast rival, Kelantan FA.

In the 1992 season, Terengganu F.C. recorded their highest ever finish in the league when they finished as runner-up to Pahang FA. The Elephants broke The Turtles hearts again in the semi finals of the Malaysia Cup competition after neither side scored in 180 minutes of play, the match went into sudden-death extra-time.

For the next few seasons, Terengganu F.C. struggled and their lowest moment came in the 1997 season when they finished bottom of the table, resulting in them being in the second division when the Malaysian League changed into a two-tier competition again in 1998.

In that season, with Abdul Rahman Ibrahim at the helm, Terengganu F.C. emerged as second division champion and went all the way to the final of the Malaysia Cup, the first one held at the newly opened Bukit Jalil National Stadium. Perak FA were the opponents and both teams entertained the 100,000 capacity crowd with exciting football. However both teams could not be separated after 120 minutes of play with the result stood at 1–1. The lottery of the penalty shootout was used to determine the winner and in the end it was third time unlucky for Terengganu F.C. in a Malaysia Cup final, losing the shootouts 5–3.

In 1999, Che Mat Jusoh, who was the Terengganu F.C. President at that time, was appointed to lead the team. He successfully guiding the team Terengganu champion in 2000 and 2011 season and runner-up in the 2004 season of the FA Cup. The team won first title in the Malaysia Cup in the 2001 season and runner-up in 2011 season. Terengganu won the Malaysia Charity Shield in the 2001 season. The team succeed to improve position in 2005/2006 Premier League season. The team ended in runner-up place during the season. In the 2010 season, Terengganu ended at third place in Super League and runners-up in 2011 season.

At the end of the 2013 season, Che Mat Jusoh eventually withdrew from the presidency Terengganu F.C. after he failed to bring silverwares to the team as required by Terengganu fans. As Datuk Wan Ahmad Nizam take over Terengganu in 2013, he want to change Terengganu F.C. in the upcoming seasons to be a title contender in Malaysian League.

2011 season

In the 2011 season, Terengganu had won Malaysia FA Cup, runner-up Malaysia Cup and Malaysia Super League by the guidance of Irfan Bakti.

Terengganu won the title of Malaysia FA Cup for the second time. Therefore, they qualified to compete in 2012 AFC Cup. Nordin Alias became the hero for the team. He scored the winning goal in extra time.

During the Malaysia Cup, Terengganu lost to Negeri Sembilan F.A. during the final match that was held at Shah Alam Stadium. In the quarter-final, Terengganu overcame their rival, Kelantan F.A.. In the semi final, Selangor F.A. also become prey to The Turtles when beaten 2–0 at home by two goals by Abdul Manaf Mamat. While in the second leg, Terengganu won 2–1 (Agg Terengganu 4–1 Selangor).

In the final, Terengganu opened the scoring with Ashari Samsudin in the 59th minute. In the 81st minute, N. Sembilan equalised through S. Kunalan. But, Hairuddin Omar disappointed Terengganu with his bicycle kick in the 86th minute. Terengganu lost to Negeri Sembilan 1–2.

At the end of the season, the coach of Terengganu, Irfan Bakti announced that he will move to another team for the next season.

2020 season

In the 2020 season, Terengganu FC had performed well to finish third in the Malaysia Super League.

At least 30,000 people came to Sultan Mizan Zainal Abidin Stadium to watch the first match of the league between Terengganu FC and Perak FA. However, Terengganu lost 1–3 in the match. Terengganu went on to win 4–3 against Kedah FA as the away team and draws 3–3 against Selangor FA.

However, the Malaysian Football League was then postponed for 159 days due to COVID-19.

Terengganu FC's first game after a long time Malaysian football is put to rest is against Petaling Jaya City FC in Petaling Jaya Stadium where Terengganu won 2–0 against The Phoenix.

Terengganu FC's 2–1 victory against Pahang FA which is the final match of the league confirms the club's final position in the league.

Terengganu went on to play Petaling Jaya City FC again in the Malaysia Cup and won 1–0 to advance to the quarter-finals to face Perak FA which is the same team who defeated Terengganu in the 2018 Malaysia Cup in the epic final match where The Bos Gaurus defeated The Turtles via penalty shootout after the match ended 3-3 after extra time.
However, the competition was cancelled following the government's rejection of MFL's appeal due to the COVID-19 pandemic in Malaysia.

The winner of the competition is supposed to gain a free slot to the 2021 AFC Cup but the slot was passed to the team who finished in the third place in the league that season. By finishing in the third place, Terengganu FC will automatically gain a slot in the 2021 AFC Cup.

Stadium
Terengganu F.C. currently use the Sultan Mizan Zainal Abidin Stadium, Terengganu, Malaysia as their home venue.

Previously, Terengganu F.C. used the compact Sultan Ismail Nasiruddin Shah Stadium as their home venue since the stadium was completed in the late 1960s. In July 2008, they moved to the Sultan Mizan Zainal Abidin Stadium and would share the venue with Terengganu F.C. II.

The stadium was built when Terengganu was awarded the right to host the Sukma Games 2008 and was completed in April that year. Sultan Mizan Zainal Abidin himself, who was then the 13th Yang DiPertuan Agong officiated the stadium on 10 May 2008.

Terengganu F.C. began using the stadium as their home venue in July 2008 with Melaka having the honour of being the first opponent of The Turtles for the match played on 15 July.

However, the roof structure of the stadium collapsed on 2 June 2009 forcing Terengganu F.C. to move back to the Sultan Ismail Nasiruddin Shah Stadium, which at the time was in process of being torn down. The upper sections which expanded the original capacity of the stadium to 20,000 spectators had been taken down and the pitch was in a bad state due to the heavy vehicles being driven on it.

Due to the urgent state of affairs at that time, the stadium was quickly fixed and was restored to meet the minimum requirement of the Football Association of Malaysia (FAM) and Terengganu F.C. were spared from playing the home matches somewhere else but with a reduced capacity of just 15,000.

Further upgrades were installed at the stadium in 2012 when Terengganu F.C. qualified for the AFC Cup tournament after winning the FA Cup the previous season.

In May 2015 the Sultan Mizan Zainal Abidin Stadium was given the green light by FAM to hold competitive matches again after their competition committee members were satisfied with the repairs and upgrades carried out at the stadium.

Terengganu F.C. returned to the Sultan Mizan Zainal Abidin Stadium but Terengganu F.C. II decided to stay at the Sultan Ismail Nasiruddin Shah Stadium.

However, the first match played there after the re-opening ended with crowd trouble after Terengganu fans rioted after Terengganu F.C. were knocked out of the FA Cup by the Lions XII due to their dissatisfaction with match officials decisions. Terengganu F.C. were fined by FAM and were ordered to play two matches without any spectator.

The original capacity of the stadium was 51,000 but due to safety reasons the upper tier of the main stand is closed thus reducing the capacity of the stadium to just 35,000 spectators at any one time.

For the 2018 season, Terengganu F.C. currently use the Sultan Ismail Nasiruddin Shah Stadium, Terengganu, Malaysia as their home venue as the Sultan Mizan Zainal Abidin Stadium is being renovated once again.

Ownership and finances

Sponsorship

At the beginning of 2013, a local textile company called Desa Murni Batik agreed to sponsor Terengganu for a year worth RM400,000 and it was the biggest investment the company had ever made.

AL became the club's apparel sponsor from 2019 to 2021.

In 2022, Umbro Malaysia through Al Ikhsan once again agreed to be the official sponsor and supplier of Terengganu kits for the 2022 and 2023 seasons with a sponsorship value of RM1.8 million and this is the biggest value the brand has ever offered to a club in Malaysia at this time. The last time Umbro sponsored Terengganu was in the 2014 and 2015 seasons.

On 18 January 2022, TDC Holdings Sdn Bhd signed a two-year contract as the main sponsor for the 2022 and 2023 seasons and became the new platinum sponsor for Terengganu FC replacing Yakult Malaysia and RedOne. They agreed to give RM4 million in cash and RM500,000 in goods making a total of RM4.5 million for the two seasons.

Players

First-team squad

 U23

 A

 U23
 I
 I
 S
 A
 I

 U23

 U23

 I

 S

 I

Remarks:
I These players are registered as International player.
A These players are registered as Asian player.
S These players are registered as ASEAN player.
U23 These players are registered as Under-23 player.
U18 These players are registered as Under-18 player.

Out on loan

Development squad

Terengganu F.C. III (U-21)
Terengganu F.C. III competes in Malaysia President Cup.

Terengganu F.C. IV (U-19)
Terengganu F.C. IV competes in Malaysia Youth Cup.

Coaching staff

Head coach history

Management team

Board of Terengganu

Terengganu Football Club

Honours

Domestic competitions

League

 Division 1/Super League 
 Runner-up (4): 1992, 2001, 2011, 2022
 Division 2/Premier League
 Winners (2): 1990, 1998
 Runner-up (1): 2017
 Division 3/FAM League/M3 League
 Winners (1): 1969

Cups

 Charity Cup
 Winners (1): 2001
 Runner-up (2): 2002, 2023
 Malaysia Cup
 Winners (1): 2001
 Runner-up (5): 1973, 1982, 1998, 2011, 2018 
 FA Cup
 Winners (2): 2000, 2011
 Runner-up (3): 1999, 2004, 2022

Foreign competitions

Sheikh Kamal International Club Cup
 Winners (1): 2019

AFC competitions

AFC Cup
 Round of 16 (1): 2012

Preseason  competitions

Terengganu Chief Minister's Cup
 Winners (1): 2018

Club records

Updated on 1 January 2021.

Note:

Pld = Played, W = Won, D = Drawn, L = Lost, F = Goals for, A = Goals against, Pts= Points, Pos = Position

Source:

Continental record

Individual player awards

Malaysia Super League Golden Boots – Top Goalscorer Overall

References

External links
 Terengganu F.C. Official Website

Malaysia Super League clubs
Football clubs in Malaysia
Malaysia Cup winners
 
1956 establishments in British Malaya
Association football clubs established in 1956